A protonic ceramic fuel cell or PCFC is a fuel cell based around a ceramic, solid, electrolyte material as the proton conductor from anode to cathode. These fuel cells produce electricity by removing an electron from a hydrogen atom, pushing the charged hydrogen atom through the ceramic membrane, and returning the electron to the hydrogen on the other side of the ceramic membrane during a reaction with oxygen. The reaction of many proposed fuels in PCFCs produce electricity and heat, the latter keeping the device at a suitable temperature. Efficient proton conductivity through most discovered ceramic electrolyte materials require elevated operational temperatures around 600-700 degrees Celsius, however intermediate temperature (200-400 degrees Celsius) ceramic fuel cells and lower temperature alternative are an active area of research.  In addition to hydrogen gas, the ability to operate at intermediate and high temperatures enables the use of a variety of liquid hydrogen carrier fuels, including: ammonia, and methane.  The technology shares the thermal and kinetic advantages of high temperature molten carbonate and solid oxide fuel cells, while exhibiting all of the intrinsic benefits of proton conduction in proton exchange membrane fuel cells (PEMFC) and phosphoric acid fuel cells (PAFC). PCFCs exhaust water at the cathode and unused fuel, fuel reactant products and fuel impurities at the anode. Common chemical compositions of the ceramic membranes are barium zirconate (BaZrO3), cesium dihydrogen phosphate (CsH2PO4), and complex solid solutions of those materials with other ceramic oxides. The acidic oxide ceramics are sometimes broken into their own class of protonic ceramic fuel cells termed "solid acid fuel cells".  

Some PCFCs operate at high enough temperatures that fuels can be electrochemically oxidized at the anode, not needing the intermediate step of producing hydrogen through reforming process. In this setting, gaseous molecules of the hydrocarbon fuel are absorbed on the surface of the anode in the presence of water vapor, with carbon dioxide as the primary reaction product; hydrogen atoms are efficiently stripped off to be turned into H+ ions then moving into the electrolyte to the other side (cathode) where they react with oxygen in the air to produce water. Other PCFCs operate at lower temperatures and utilize chemical catalysts in addition to electrochemical catalysts to produce hydrogen for the reduction reaction.

Applications and commercial development
PCFCs operating at intermediate temperature of 200 - 400 degrees Celsius have been proposed for heavy duty trucking. Remote power applications using PCFCs have been demonstrated at Canadian oil wells.

See also

 Glossary of fuel cell terms
 Hydrogen technologies

References

Further reading

Duan, Chuancheng, et al. "Readily processed protonic ceramic fuel cells with high performance at low temperatures." Science 349.6254 (2015): 1321-1326.
Duan, Chuancheng, et al. "Highly durable, coking and sulfur tolerant, fuel-flexible protonic ceramic fuel cells." Nature557.7704 (2018): 217.
Duan, Chuancheng, et al. "Highly efficient reversible protonic ceramic electrochemical cells for power generation and fuel production." Nature Energy 4.3 (2019): 230.

Fuel cells